The Campolieto-Monacilioni Railway station is the train station that serves the municipalities of Campolieto and Monacilioni, is situated in the Campolieto territory.

References 

This article is based upon a translation of the Italian language version as at May 2017.

Railway stations in Molise
Railway lines opened in 1883